Camp Lay was a Confederate army encampment during the American Civil War located near Tallahassee in Leon County, Florida, United States.  Its exact location is not currently known.

Camp Lay is known to have had these individuals:
Private Joseph White Campbell, who enlisted April 20, 1864, Company B, 8th Florida Infantry. Campbell was from Gadsden County.
Private Jonah Beale Davis, who enlisted September 24, 1864, Company B, 8th Florida Infantry. Davis was from Decatur County, Georgia.

See also
Camp Leon
Camp Mary Davis

References

History of Leon County, Florida
Florida in the American Civil War
Military history of the Confederate States of America